The 2023 European Women Basketball Championship, commonly called EuroBasket Women 2023, will be the 39th edition of the continental tournament in women's basketball, sanctioned by the FIBA Europe. It will be co-hosted by Slovenia and Israel between 15 and 25 June 2023. The games will be played in Tel Aviv and Ljubljana.

Qualification

Qualified teams

Venues
The tournament was planned to be played in four venues in four cities. Three venues would have been used for Slovenia and one for Israel. The preliminary matches were scheduled to be held in Tel Aviv, Celje and Koper. The final round will be played in the Slovenian capital Ljubljana. In June 2022, it was announced that Ljubljana will host all games played in Slovenia.

Ljubljana: Arena Stožice (12,480)
Tel Aviv: Menora Mivtachim Arena (10,383)

Draw
The draw took place on 8 March 2023 in Ljubljana, Slovenia where teams were drawn into four groups of four teams. Teams were seeded according to the FIBA World Rankings.

Seedings
The seeding was confirmed on 6 March 2023. Hosts Slovenia and Israel will each be drawn into a group playing on home soil. Furthermore, before the draw, Slovenia chose to be paired with Serbia, although they would play in different groups, while Israel paired with the Czech Republic and agreed to play in the same group.

Preliminary round

Group A

Group B

Group C

Group D

Knockout stage

Bracket

Classification games to Olympic Qualifying Tournaments

Qualification to quarterfinals

Quarterfinals

Classification games to Olympic Qualifying Tournaments

Fifth place game

Semifinals

Third place game

Final

References

External links
Official website

2023
EuroBasket Women
EuroBasket Women 2023
EuroBasket Women 2023
Basketball, EuroBasket Women 2023
Basketball, 2023 EuroBasket Women
EuroBasket Women 2023
June 2023 sports events in Europe
21st century in Ljubljana
21st century in Tel Aviv
2022–23 in Israeli basketball
2022–23 in Slovenian basketball
2020s in Slovak women's sport
2020s in Israeli women's sport